Scott Robert Anson (born 29 April 1989) is a Scottish footballer who is currently with Cumnock Juniors in the West Region of the Scottish Junior Football Association.

Career
Anson was a product of the youth development system at Hamilton Academical. He made his senior debut aged 16 for Hamilton, coming on as a substitute in a 1–0 victory over Stranraer on 28 March 2006. At the end of that season he was snapped up by Kilmarnock.

In August 2008 he signed a loan deal with Montrose until December, then in January he moved on loan to Annan Athletic. Anson made his debut for Kilmarnock as a substitute in a 3–1 defeat against Heart of Midlothian on 4 April 2009. Anson left Kilmarnock at the end of the 2008–09 season and he signed for Annan Athletic.

His contract with Annan was cancelled after the 2009–2010 season by mutual consent, with Anson citing a desire to return to full-time football as the reason. After periods on trial with Galway United and Clyde in the summer of 2010, Anson moved into the Junior game with Bo'ness United in November of that year.

He has since played for Petershill, Neilston Juniors, Shettleston and returned for his second spell at Cumnock Juniors in June 2016.

References

External links

1989 births
Annan Athletic F.C. players
Association football forwards
Clyde F.C. players
Hamilton Academical F.C. players
Kilmarnock F.C. players
Living people
Montrose F.C. players
Footballers from Glasgow
Scottish Premier League players
Scottish footballers
Scottish Football League players
Bo'ness United F.C. players
Petershill F.C. players
Neilston Juniors F.C. players
Cumnock Juniors F.C. players
Glasgow United F.C. players
Scottish Junior Football Association players